Monterosa may refer to:

 Monterosa (Warrenton, Virginia), a historic home located at Warrenton, Fauquier County, Virginia, USA
 Monterosa tomato, a hybrid tomato cultivar
 Monterosa Ski, an Italian ski resort
 947 Monterosa, a minor planet orbiting the Sun

See also
 Isotta Fraschini Tipo 8C Monterosa, a prototype Italian car of the 1940s manufactured by Isotta Fraschini
 Monte Rosa (disambiguation)